William Edward "Kitty" Bransfield (January 7, 1875 – May 1, 1947) was an American professional baseball first baseman. He played in Major League Baseball (MLB) from 1898 to 1911 for the Boston Beaneaters, Pittsburgh Pirates, Philadelphia Phillies, and Chicago Cubs.

Playing career
Bransfield played a season of semipro baseball with a team in Grafton in 1897. After a brief major league stint with Boston in 1898, Bransfield returned to the big leagues with the Pittsburgh Pirates in 1901. He played four seasons with the team, most notably serving as the Pirates first baseman in 1903, the year in which the team lost the inaugural World Series to Boston. He subsequently played for the Philadelphia Phillies and Chicago Cubs.

In 1330 games over 12 seasons, Bransfield posted a .270 batting average (1351-for-4999) with 529 runs, 225 doubles, 75 triples, 13 home runs, 637 RBI, 175 stolen bases, 221 bases on balls, .304 on-base percentage, and .353 slugging percentage. He finished his career with a .983 fielding percentage. In the 1903 World Series, he hit .207 (6-for-29) with 3 runs and 1 RBI.

Later life
After his playing career, Bransfield spent time as an umpire, scout, and manager. He managed the Montreal club briefly, then umpired in the Eastern and New England Leagues from 1915 to 1921. He was then signed as a scout for the Chicago Cubs for the 1922 season. In 1923, he managed the Waterbury club in the New England League.

References

External links

1875 births
1947 deaths
19th-century baseball players
Major League Baseball first basemen
Boston Beaneaters players
Pittsburgh Pirates players
Philadelphia Phillies players
Chicago Cubs players
Chicago Cubs scouts
Louisville Colonels (minor league) players
Montreal Royals players
Montreal Royals managers
Major League Baseball umpires
Baseball players from Worcester, Massachusetts
Newport Colts players